Princess Orabindu Benyabhak or Phra Chao Boromwongse Ther Phra Ong Chao Orabindu Benyabhak (RTGS: Oraphin Phenphak) (27 April 1873 – 26 January 1935), was a Princess of Siam (later Thailand. Princess Benyabhak was a member of Siamese Royal Family. She was a daughter of Chulalongkorn, King Rama V of Siam.

Her mother was Chao Chom Manda Mom Rajawongse Yoi Isarankura, daughter of Mom Chao Sobhon Isarankura (son of Prince Kes, the Prince Isranuraksa, who originated the Royal House of Isrankura.

Royal Duties
Princess Orabindu Benyabhak carried out many royal duties for Thai people. She performed many duties on behalf of her father, King Chulalongkorn, and on behalf of her half brother, King Vajiravudh (Rama VI). In 1916, she established the Orabindu building in Wat Bowornniwes School, which is a single-floor building, with 7 classrooms.

Moreover, when she was suffering from illness, she signed her will, donating 50,000 bahts as the scholarship and foundation of Chulalongkorn Hospital, for helping people suffering sickness.

Princess Orabindu Benyabhak died on 26 January 1935, at the age of 61.

Royal Decorations
  Dame Cross of the Most Illustrious Order of Chula Chom Klao (First class): received 16 November 1930

Ancestry

1873 births
1935 deaths
19th-century Thai people
19th-century Thai women
19th-century Chakri dynasty
20th-century Chakri dynasty
Thai female Phra Ong Chao
Dames Grand Cross of the Order of Chula Chom Klao
Children of Chulalongkorn
Daughters of kings